The Simurq PFC 2009–10 season was Simurq's fourth Azerbaijan Premier League season, which they finished in 8th position. They were knocked out of the Azerbaijan Cup by Olimpik-Shuvalan at the quarterfinal stage. It was their fourth and final season with Roman Pokora as their manager.

Squad

Transfers

Summer

In:

Out:

Winter

In:

Out:

Competitions

Azerbaijan Premier League

First round

Results

League table

Relegation group

Results

Table

Azerbaijan Cup

UEFA Europa League

Qualifying phase

Squad statistics

Appearances and goals

|-
|colspan="14"|Players who appeared for Simurq who left during the season:

|}

Goal scorers

Notes
Note 1: Played in Baku at Tofik Bakhramov Stadium as Simurq Zaqatala's Zaqatala City Stadium did not meet UEFA criteria.

References
Qarabağ have played their home games at the Tofiq Bahramov Stadium since 1993 due to the ongoing situation in Quzanlı.

External links 
 Official Website
 Simurq at Soccerway.com

Simurq PIK seasons
Simurq